Florian Hecker was born in 1975 in Augsburg, Germany. He was raised in Kissing, Germany and studied Computational Linguistics and Psycholinguistics at Ludwig Maximilian Universität, Munich and Fine Arts at the Akademie der Bildenden Künste, Vienna, where he received his diploma in 2003. 
He lives and works in Vienna and Kissing, Germany.

In performances, publications and installations, Hecker deals with specific compositional developments of post-war modernity, electro-acoustic music as well as other, non-musical disciplines. He dramatizes space, time and self-perception in his sonic works by isolating specific auditory events in their singularity, thus stretching the boundaries of their materialization. Their objectual autonomy is exposed while simultaneously evoking sensations, memories and associations in an immersive intensity.

Solo exhibitions include: MMK, Museum für Moderne Kunst, Frankfurt am Main, Germany; IKON Gallery, Birmingham and Chisenhale Gallery, London, all in 2010. Bawag Contemporary, Vienna, 2009; Sadie Coles HQ, London, 2008 and Galerie Neu, Berlin, 2007.

Some of the group exhibitions and projects Hecker has participated in include Push and Pull, MUMOK, Vienna, 2010; Evento, Bordeaux, Thyssen-Bornemisza Art Contemporary, The Kaleidoscopic Eye, Mori Art Museum, Tokyo, UBS Openings: Saturday Live: Characters, Figures and Signs, Tate Modern, London and his most recent collaboration with Cerith Wyn Evans, No night No day, was premiered at the Teatro Goldoni as part of Fare Mondi, 53rd Venice Biennale, all in 2009. Manifesta 7, Trentino - South Tyrol, Italy, Art unlimited, Art Basel, Experiment Marathon Reykjavik, Reykjavík Art Museum in 2008, and Cerith Wyn Evans, Lenbachhaus, Munich in 2006. Off the Record, Musée d'Art Moderne de la Ville de Paris, Paris and 3rd Berlin Biennale, Berlin, in 2004, 2nd International Biennial for Contemporary Art, Gothenburg, 2003 and Mutations, TN Probe Gallery, Tokyo and Ausgeträumt..., Secession, Vienna both in 2001.

Hecker has given a multitude of performances, audio presentations and concerts internationally since 1996. Amongst many other places, he presented his work at Les Spectacles vivants, Centre Georges Pompidou, Paris, 2012; MIT Saarinen Chapel, Cambridge, MA; Lampo, Graham Foundation, Chicago; Push & Pull, Tate Modern, all 2011, Life is Live # 2: listen with pain!, Hebbel am Ufer, Berlin, 2010; Sound out of line, Urbanomic Studio, Falmouth; Comme des Garçons Homme Plus, Palais de la Bourse, Paris, 2009; Utopia of Sound, Akademie der Bildenden Künste, Vienna, 2008; Bridge the Gap?4, CCA, Kitakyushu and Shanghai; Cut and Splice, ICA, London, both 2006. Casa Da Música, Porto; ZKM, Karlsruhe; No Fun Festival, Brooklyn, in 2005. Taktlos, Dampfzentrale, Bern; Freunde Guter Musik, Maria am Ufer, Berlin, in 2006. CCA, Kitakyushu; Ars Electronica, Brucknerhaus, Linz; All Tomorrows Parties, Chamber Sands; Sonic Light (Sonic Acts Festival) Amsterdam in 2003. büro 44, Purple Institute, Paris; Número Festival, Lisbon; International Triennale of Contemporary Art, Yokohama, Japan; Nesh, Electrowerkz, London; LoveBytes, Sheffield all in 2001. büro 30, Spiral Hall / CAY, Tokyo; Sónar, MACBA, Barcelona; Synthèse 2000, IMEB, Bourges; Avanto, Kiasma, Museum of Contemporary Art, Helsinki; Wien Modern, Konzerthaus, Vienna in 2000.

Since 2005 Hecker presented a series of UPIC Diffusion Sessions in collaboration with Russell Haswell, as “Haswell & Hecker”, performing recordings made exclusively with Iannis Xenakis graphic input computer music system. Amongst many other locations, at Serralves em Festa, Fundação Serralves, Porto, 2009; Conway Hall, London; Patronage of Space, Lopud; Donaufestival, Krems; Kunsthalle, Zürich all in 2007 and Cubitt at City University, London, 2005. In 2011, Editions Mego released Kanal GENDYN, a vinyl record and audio only DVD set, documenting a performance of Haswell & Hecker from 2004 employing exclusively Alberto de Campo's SuperCollider 2 version of Xenakis’ GENDYN (French for ‘GENeration DYNamique stochastique’ or English ‘Dynamic Stochastic Synthesis’) sound synthesis procedure.

Together with artist Yasunao Tone, he performed Palimpsest at Recombinant Media Labs, San Francisco; Experimental Intermedia, New York, in 2005; MIT Media Lab, Cambridge, MA, 2004; LAMPO, 6Odum, Chicago and at Spectacles Vivants, Centre Georges Pompidou, Paris, in 2002 amongst other locations.

In 2009 he collaborated on a series of performances with Aphex Twin, including amongst others Sacrum Profanum, Kraków; Warp20, Cité de la Musique, Paris and Bloc Weekend, Minehead.

Selected discography

 Hecker: 2⁄8 Bregman 4⁄8 Deutsch 7⁄8 Hecker 1⁄8 Höller, 2 x 10” Vinyl, Presto?!, Milano, 2011
 Haswell & Hecker: Kanal GENDYN, DVD & 12” Vinyl, Editions Mego, Wien, 2011
 Hecker: Bregman / Deutsch Chimaera – 47 minutes in bifurcated attention, Ràdio Web MACBA, Barcelona, 2011
 Hecker: Speculative Solution, CD & book, Editions Mego, Wien, 2011
 Hecker: Sun Pandämonium, 12” Vinyl, Pan, Berlin, 2011
 Hecker: 3 Track”, 12” Vinyl, Editions Mego, Wien, 2010
 Hecker: NEU CD, CD, Galerie Neu, Berlin, 2010
 Hecker: Acid in the Style of David Tudor, CD, Editions Mego, Wien, 2009
 Hecker, Live @ WDR, MC, Tochnit Aleph, Berlin, 2009
 Haswell & Hecker: Popol Vuh Remix, 12” Vinyl, Editions Mego, Wien, 2008
 Haswell & Hecker: UPIC Warp Tracks, CD, Warp Records, London, 2008
 Hecker: Hecker, Höller, Tracks, 2 x LP, Semishigure, Berlin, 2007
 Haswell & Hecker: Visionaire Magazine 53 Sound, 5 LP & 2 CD, New York, 2007
 Haswell & Hecker: Blackest Ever Black (Electroacoustic UPIC Recordings), CD & 2 x LP Warner Classics, London, 2007
 Hecker: Recordings for Rephlex, CD, Rephlex, London, 2006
 Hecker / Voafose: KIT 001, 10” Vinyl, Rephlex, London, 2006 ("Precedence")
 Hecker: Live @ ZKM, MC, Tochnit Aleph, Berlin, 2006
 Carsten Höller, Une Exposition a Marseilles, catalogue & DVD, MAC Marseilles / Verlag Walther König, Cologne, 2006
 Hecker: Electronic Music Soundtrack for ‘The Disenchanted Forest x 1001’ by Angela Bulloch, 2 x CD, Editions Mego, Wien, 2006
 Hecker: Live @ ZKM, CD, Badischer Kunstverein / Mego, Karlsruhe / Wien, 2005
 Haswell & Hecker: Revision, 12" Vinyl, Mego, Wien, 2005
 Substantials #02, Book & CD, CCA Kitakyushu, Japan, 2005
 Yasunao Tone & Hecker: Palimpsest, CD, Mego, Wien, 2004
 Hecker: PV Trecks, CD, Kölnischer Kunstverein – Mego, Cologne / Wien, 2004
 Hecker: 2 Track 12”, 12” Vinyl, Mego, Wien, 2003
 Hecker: Sun Pandämonium, CD, Mego, Wien, 2003
 Skot vs. Hecker (Tina Frank & Mathias Gmachl & Florian Hecker): Skot vs. Hecker, Mini DV & VHS, Mego, Wien, 2001
 CD Slopper (Oswald Berthold, Florian Hecker): Saskie Woxi, CD, OR, London, 2001
 Ausgeträumt..., catalogue & CD, Secession, Wien, 2001
 Hecker: [R*] iso|chall, CD, Mego, Wien, 2000
 Hecker: [OT] Xackpy Breakpoint:, CD-R, OR CD-R, London, 1999
 Esognomig (Ramon Bauer, Frank Dommert, Tina Frank, Florian Hecker, Andi Toma, Jan St. Werner), Esognomig, 12” Vinyl, Sonig, Cologne, 1999
 Hecker: Untitled, 3” CD-R, Alku, Barcelona, 1999
 Hecker: IT iso 161975, CD, Mego 014, Wien, 1998

Exhibitions
(2016) Formulations, MMK Museum für Moderne Kunst, Frankfurt
(2015) Formulations, Culturgest, Porto 
(2013) Documenta 13, "Chimerization" documenta13 Kassel, Germany
(2012) Florian Hecker Exhibition: 'Articulação' (Lumiar Cité, Lisbon, Portugal).
(2008) Florian Hecker Exhibition: 'Pentaphonic Dark Matter' (Sadie Coles Gallery, Heddon St).

Bibliography

 Florian Hecker - Formulations, [Published on the occasion of the exhibitions at Cultugest, Porto, 26.09.- 19.12.2016, and MMK Museum für Moderne Kunst Frankfurt am Main, 26.11.2016 - 05.02.2017], London: Koenig Books, 2016. 
 Florian Hecker: event, stream, object. Cologne: Verlag der Bucchandlung Walther König; MMK Museum für Moderne Kunst, 2010.
 Florian Hecker, Russell Haswell, Robin Mackay. "Blackest ever black." Collapse (Oxford), vol. 3 (2007): 108–139.
 Florian Hecker. "A presentation of recent works." Substantials (Kitakyushu), no. 2 (2005) : 4-27.
 Nick Cain. "Dark matter compiler." The wire (London), no. 298 (December 2008).

References

External links 
  on EditionsMego.com
 Biography on Mego.at
 Florian Hecker's personal blog
 Interview with Florian Hecker, where he discusses the idea of sounds as objects and the notion of decomposition in his chimerical pieces (2014)
 Exclusive generative audio piece by Florian Hecker for the Composing with Process series at Ràdio Web MACBA
 'Bregman / Deutsch Chimaera - 47 minutes in bifurcated attention, a podcast on psychoacoustics by Florian Hecker for Ràdio Web MACBA

1975 births
Living people
21st-century German musicians
21st-century Austrian musicians
21st-century composers
German electronic musicians
Austrian electronic musicians
German expatriates in Austria
Musicians from Augsburg
German contemporary artists